Edinburgh Gardens is a large park located in the inner Melbourne suburb of North Fitzroy. It is bounded by Brunswick Street and St Georges Road to the west, the curve of Alfred Crescent to the north and east, and Freeman Street to the south. It was created from a grant of land in March 1862 by Queen Victoria and laid out by Clement Hodgkinson, who designed many of Melbourne's parks and gardens.

History

Statement of Significance 1978
Edinburgh Gardens were nominated for inclusion on the Register of the National Estate in 1978.
"The Edinburgh Gardens are significant in terms of the large number of established trees and garden beds and the associated garden furniture – cast iron bollards, drinking fountain, fixed seats and bandstand. The tennis club house, train track and fixed train engine and the Bowling Club house and lawns are integral to this significance, while the adjacent cricket ground, with its two gatehouses and historic grandstand, is of complementary significance. They are also notable for the open space they provide and the manner in which they complement and close the vistas observable while passing along Alfred Crescent. The significance of the precinct is seen to lie in the marriage of the built environment with a sylvan landscape. It is enhanced by the quality of individual elements, both built and floral, in terms of their historical, architectural, recreational and visual amenity".

Statement of Significance 2004
"The area later known as the Edinburgh Gardens was set aside as a temporary public reserve in 1862. Soon after the reservation was gazetted, the first of the sporting organizations to become associated with the place, the Collingwood Commercial Cricket Club was given occupancy, establishing a tradition of organised sport within the Gardens which continues today. Around 1872 the reserve acquired its name, commemorating Prince Alfred, the Duke of Edinburgh. The balance of the Gardens was not immediately laid out or cultivated, and grazing of the land continued until the early 1880s. While the various sporting clubs had already made improvements to their respective areas, the Fitzroy Council was not appointed as managers of the Gardens until 1878. In 1882 the Gardens were permanently reserved and in 1883 a formal layout, trenching and tree planting commenced to the straightforward design of Joseph Martin Reed, Victorian Lands Department district surveyor. In 1888 the Gardens were divided by an excision of land through the centre for construction of the Fitzroy spur line of the Inner Circle Railway. The Gardens continued to be redeveloped to various degrees throughout the twentieth century with the addition of further sporting, ornamental and memorial structures and plantings.
The Edinburgh Gardens retains most of its earliest path system as well as a number of subsequent additions. It also retains avenues of mature elms, together with other specimen trees and significant twentieth century examples of rare perimeter planting. A substantial number of significant nineteenth and early twentieth century structures and buildings survive within the Gardens."

Description
The Edinburgh Gardens precinct is defined by the escargot shaped reserve originally set aside for Public Gardens, the Fitzroy and the North Fitzroy Cricket Grounds and a [former] railway station and line. The unique shape of the gardens stems from the resolution between different street grids and the desire to create a circus along Georgian lines. The scheme for a grand crescent with central gardens, playing grounds and rail facilities was developed as the most logical answer to this dilemma.

The park is unique due not only to the size, but also the strange features, and unusual history of the reserve. For example, the centrepiece of the park is a pedestal designed to hold a large statue of Queen Victoria. However, this statue only stood watch over the gardens for three years before mysteriously going missing more than a century ago. It was never replaced, and the bare plinth remains as a strange reminder.

Former railway in Edinburgh Gardens

A spur of the former Inner Circle Railway once bisected the gardens. The Fitzroy spur diverged from the line along Park Street, followed Mark Street across Alfred Crescent and finished at the former Fitzroy Station, located behind Brunswick Street Oval. This passenger service was never viable, and was closed only a few years after being built. The area was then used as a freight yard until the 1980s.

Some sections of the old track are still visible through the park. Level crossings were retained when the tracks were removed. The old line has been replaced with a shared path that joins the Linear Park Reserve and leads to the nearby Capital City Trail.

Factories associated with the line have been demolished and the land either returned to the Edinburgh Gardens or sold.

A timber pedestrian bridge remained in the south-west of the gardens until about 2003. it was sold and removed to make way for a low-rise development for the Office of housing.

W.T. Peterson Community Oval

An Australian rules football oval located at the south-western corner of the gardens, the W.T. Peterson Community Oval (named after a 21-year veteran of the Fitzroy City Council) (GC: 
) is better known to generations of Fitzroy Football Club supporters as the Brunswick Street Oval.  The ground has a capacity of approximately 15 000 spectators. It served as the club's home ground in the VFA competition, and later the VFL competition from 1883 until 1966. The last game played there was in August 1966 when Fitzroy played St Kilda. Fitzroy lost that match by 84 points. Currently the ground is used by the Fitzroy Football Club playing in the VAFA and the Fitzroy Junior Football Club in the YJFL, it is considered the spiritual home ground of Fitzroy. The playing ground is now framed by the remaining original features of the oval: the visiting members gate structure at the corner Freeman and Brunswick Streets, and late nineteenth century grandstand, gates and ticket box on the opposite side of the oval. The main grandstand is on the Victorian Heritage Register.

The ground record crowd for Brunswick Street Oval was set on 6 May 1935 when 36,000 fans saw Fitzroy draw with Collingwood. Both sides scored 14 goals and 9 behinds and were deadlocked on 93 points.

In popular culture

• The Rotunda to the west of the Gardens is the centrepiece of the Melbourne indie-rock band The Lucksmiths song "Under The Rotunda".

References

External links
"Around the Grounds" – Web Documentary – Brunswick Street
"Edinburgh Gardens Conservation Management Plan" – Allom Lovell & Associates and John Patrick Pty Ltd, January 2004
"Edinburgh Gardens Master Plan" – John Patrick Pty Ltd, 2003

Parks in Melbourne
Sports venues in Melbourne
Gardens in Victoria (Australia)
1862 establishments in Australia
Landmarks in Melbourne
City of Yarra